The following lists events that happened during 2010 in South Africa.

Incumbents
 President: Jacob Zuma.
 Deputy President: Kgalema Motlanthe.
 Chief Justice: Sandile Ngcobo.

Cabinet 
The Cabinet, together with the President and the Deputy President, forms part of the Executive.

National Assembly

Provincial Premiers 
 Eastern Cape Province: Noxolo Kiviet 
 Free State Province: Ace Magashule 
 Gauteng Province: Nomvula Mokonyane 
 KwaZulu-Natal Province: Zweli Mkhize 
 Limpopo Province: Cassel Mathale
 Mpumalanga Province: David Mabuza
 North West Province: Maureen Modiselle (until 19 November), Thandi Modise (since 19 November)
 Northern Cape Province: Hazel Jenkins 
 Western Cape Province: Helen Zille

Events
February
 24 – Advocate Cézanne Visser is sentenced to seven years in prison by the North Gauteng High Court.
 24 – Nersa grants Eskom a 24.8% fee increase, 25.8% in 2011 and 25.9% in 2012.
 25 – The North Gauteng High Court rules that farmers whose land was seized in Zimbabwe can be compensated with Zimbabwean assets in South Africa.

March
 2 – Minister of Arts and Culture Lulama Xingwana leaves an art exhibition, allegedly because it depicts same-sex couples.

May
 1 – King Shaka International Airport in Durban is opened and replaces Durban International Airport.

June
 11 to 11 July – The 2010 FIFA World Cup takes place in South Africa and is won by Spain, with the Netherlands as the runner-up.

July
 2 – Former Chief of Police and Chief of Interpol, Jackie Selebi, is found guilty of corruption, but not guilty on further charges of perverting the course of justice.

August
 25 – In the Blackheath train accident a minibus carrying 14 school children is struck by a train at a level crossing in Cape Town. Nine die on the scene and a 10th child later dies in hospital.
 24-26 – President Jacob Zuma leads a delegation of over 200 South African business leaders and entrepreneurs to the People's Republic of China to promote trade and investment between the two countries.

November
 13 – Anni Dewani, while on her honeymoon in South Africa, is kidnapped and then murdered in Gugulethu township near Cape Town.

Births

Deaths
 27 January – Ruben Kruger, Springbok rugby player. (b. 1970)
 5 February – Harry Schwarz, lawyer, politician and diplomat. (b. 1924)
 3 April – Eugène Terre'Blanche, political activist. (b. 1941)
 5 April – Molefi Sefularo, politician and deputy minister. (b. 1957)
 15 April – Lucas Malan, Afrikaans poet, author and academic. (b. 1946)
 4 May – Sheena Duncan, activist and Black Sash leader. (b. 1932)
 14 May – Frederik van Zyl Slabbert, political analyst, businessman and politician. (b. 1940)
 22 May – Lwandile Zwelenkosi Matanzima, ruler of Western Thembuland. (b. c. 1970)
 19 June – Nico Smith, activist and theologian. (b. 1929)
 18 August – Fiona Coyne, actress, author, playwright and television presenter. (b. 1965)
 19 August – Joe Matthews, activist and politician. (b. 1929)
 10 October – Rex Rabanye, jazz, fusion and soulful pop musician. (b. 1944)

Railways

Locomotives
 Transnet Freight Rail places the first of seventy-six Class 15E heavy electric freight locomotives in service on the Sishen–Saldanha iron ore line.

Sports

Rugby
 5 June – South Africa vs Wales International Rugby Friendly is played.

Football
 11 June – The 2010 FIFA World Cup begins in South Africa.
 11 July – The 2010 FIFA World Cup ends.

See also
2010 in South African television

References

South Africa
Years in South Africa
History of South Africa